Broadway's Finest is a 2012 action film, directed and produced by Stephen Marro. It stars Adam Storke, John Lavelle and Larry Pine. The film won nine awards and was nominated for nine.

Plot
Three struggling actors impersonate New York City Police Department undercover cops to take down a notorious drug dealer to get material for their edgy police drama.

Cast
John Lavelle ... Goldstone
Adam Storke ... Lewis
Nick Cornish ... Willy
Larry Pine ... A.K. Lipson
Lauren Hodges ... Lauren
Robert Clohessy ... Buckley
Robert Funaro ... Larson
David Lansbury ... Bane
Thomas G. Waites ... Caesar
Chris Kerson ... Saveno
Mark Lotito ... Captain Harrison
Mark Price ... Shelly

Awards

Won
2012 Hoboken International Film Festival:
Best Director - Stephen Marro
2012 Long Island International Film Expo
Audience Award
Best Editing - John Zieman
Best Original Score - Marshall Grantham and Ben Goldberg
Honorable Mention - John Petersen
2012 New York Visionfest
Best Writing - Stephen Marro
The Abe Schrager Award for Cinematography - Adrian Correia
2012 Hills Film Festival
Best Screenwriting
Prescott Film Festival:
Best Screenplay

Nominated
2012 Hoboken International Film Festival
Best Supporting Actor - Adam Storke
2012 Long Island International Film Expo
Best Feature Film
Best Long Island Feature
Best Director
2012 New York Visionfest:
Best Acting - Adam Storke
Best Directing - Stephen Marro
Best Score - Ben Goldberg and Marshall Grantham
Best Sound - Paul Goodrich
Best Production - Doug LeClaire and Jack Adalist

References

External links

2012 films
American crime action films
2012 crime action films
2010s English-language films
2010s American films